Louis Manton Shoobridge (25 October 1920 – 20 May 2005) was an Australian politician.

He was born in New Town in Hobart, the son of Sir Rupert Shoobridge. In 1968 he was elected to the Tasmanian Legislative Council as the independent member for Queenborough. He held the seat until his defeat in 1971.

References

1920 births
2005 deaths
Independent members of the Parliament of Tasmania
Members of the Tasmanian Legislative Council
20th-century Australian politicians